The Derry Minor Football Championship is an annual gaelic football competition between the top Derry GAA clubs. The winners qualify to represent Derry in the Ulster Minor Club Football Championship.

Bellaghy have won the competition more than any other club with 10 titles. Glen are the only club to win 4 consecutive titles. Bellaghy, Ballinascreen, Ballinderry and Slaughtneil all won 3 county titles in a row.

Magherafelt are the current champions, winning their 5th title beating Lavey 0–15 to 1–09 at Loup.

Wins Listed By Club

Notes:

1946 Sarsfields are now defunct. They were a Derry City club, a fore-runner to the modern-day Doire Colmcille club.
1948,1951 - Éire Óg club are now defunct.

Finals Listed By Year

See also
Derry GAA club football competitions

References

External links
Official Derry GAA website
Derry at Hogan Stand
Derry at ClubGAA

Derry GAA club championships
 
1
Senior Gaelic football county championships